KCH may refer to:

 Kamuzu Central Hospital in Lilongwe, Malawi
 Kennedy Center Honors
 King's College Hospital in London
 Knight Commander of the Royal Guelphic Order of the House of Hanover
 Kosciusko Community Hospital in Warsaw, Indiana, United States
 Kuching International Airport, in Malaysia
 Kwai Chung Hospital, a psychiatric hospital in Kwai Chung, Hong Kong